St George was a parliamentary constituency in what is now the London Borough of Tower Hamlets. It was part of the Parliamentary borough of Tower Hamlets and returned one Member of Parliament (MP)  to the House of Commons of the Parliament of the United Kingdom.

History
The constituency, formally known as Tower Hamlets, St George Division,  was created by the Redistribution of Seats Act 1885 by the division of the existing two-member parliamentary borough of Tower Hamlets into seven divisions, each returning one MP.

This was an area on the north bank of the River Thames, with a lot of its inhabitants employed as dock workers or in the sugar refining industry. Pelling comments that it had the largest proportion of immigrant Irishmen in the metropolis.

The constituency was marginal between the Conservative and Liberal parties. Pelling suggests the Conservative MP, elected in 1885, owed his victory to generosity "bordering on corruption". Political issues important in the area were protectionism (as sugar refining was damaged by foreign subsidies to rivals) and the immigration of "pauper aliens" (the neighbouring division of Whitechapel had a large population of immigrant Jews).

The seat was abolished for the 1918 general election. The area was incorporated in a new seat of Stepney, Whitechapel and St George's.

Boundaries

The constituency comprised two civil parishes: St George in the East and Wapping, taking its name from the former and so ultimately from St George in the East church in contrast to the St George's Hanover Square constituency in Westminster. Although lying in Middlesex, the parishes formed part of the East End of London, and were administered as part of the Metropolis.

In 1889 the area was removed from Middlesex to the new County of London, and in 1900 it was included in the Metropolitan Borough of Stepney, but no changes were made to constituency boundaries until 1918.

Members of Parliament

Election results

Elections in the 1880s

Ritchie was appointment President of the Local Government Board, requiring a by-election.

Elections in the 1890s

Elections in the 1900s

Elections in the 1910s

References

 Boundaries of Parliamentary Constituencies 1885-1972, compiled and edited by F.W.S. Craig (Parliamentary Reference Publications 1972)
 British Parliamentary Election Results 1885-1918, compiled and edited by F.W.S. Craig (The Macmillan Press 1974)
 Social Geography of British Elections 1885-1910, by Henry Pelling (Macmillan 1967)
 

Politics of the London Borough of Tower Hamlets
Parliamentary constituencies in London (historic)
Constituencies of the Parliament of the United Kingdom established in 1885
Constituencies of the Parliament of the United Kingdom disestablished in 1918